Ajibola Ponnle (born 9 September 1973) she is the current commissioner for Lagos State Ministry of Establishments, Training and Pensions appointed by Lagos State Governor.

Early life and education 
She was born on 9 September 1973. She has her B.Sc. in Economics from the University of Ibadan and a M.Sc in Organisational Psychology from the University of London.

Career 
She started her career in 1994 with Arthur Andersen's company, which is now (KPMG). Later on,  she start working with oined British American Tobacco, as the founding pre-merger,  she left the team as a Finance and Marketing Senior Management. In 2004 she decided to engage herself in entrepreneurship building up companies of which include TeamBuilding Africa Consultancy, the regional representative of Team BuiUSA. She also visit the Executive Management Programme at Lagos Business School.

Mrs Ajibola Ponnle disclosed that the state government of Lagos  attract world attention by grooming the first forensic dentist in the whole of West Africa. Under her Ministry the State government of Lagos pays 1.63 billion Naira to 321 retirees.

Personal life 
She was divorced before Justice Lateefah Okunnu of Lagos High Court, Igbosere, Lagos. after a 22 year old marriage to Abiodun Michael Ponnle. They have three children.

External links 
https://metp.lagosstate.gov.ng/2019/08/20/mrs-ajibola-yewande-olufunke-ponnle-honourable-commissioner/

References 

People from Lagos State
Living people
Nigerian women in politics
Yoruba people
1973 births